Bernard or Bernie Siegel may refer to:

Bernard Siegel (actor) (1868–1940), Eastern European-born American actor
Bernard J. Siegel (1917–2003), American anthropologist
Bernie S. Siegel (born 1932), American writer and pediatric surgeon
Bernard Siegel (attorney) (born 1949), American litigator

See also
Bernard G. Segal (1907–1997), American corporate lawyer
Harold Bernard Segel (born 1930), American academic 
Bernard Seigal (1957–2006), American musician/singer also known as "Buddy Blue"
Siegel (surname)